, translated as Combat Fleets of the World, is an almanac and a reference book of information of the world's warships arranged by nation, including information on ships' names, dimensions, armaments, silhouettes, photographs, etc. It is published in French and English. Its editions cover the warships used by national naval and paramilitary forces, and provide data on their characteristics.

The original French edition was started by Commandant de Balincourt in 1897. The current publisher is Éditions maritimes & d’outre-mer of Rennes, a subsidiary of Ouest-France. The English version, known as Combat Fleets of the World, has been published by Naval Institute Press in Annapolis (United States) since 1977. The latest English edition was the 16th edition in 2012. Both versions are published every two years.

Editors

French issue

English issue

Similar books
 Jane's Fighting Ships (United Kingdom)
 Brassey's Naval Annual (later Royal United Services Institute and Brassey's Defence Yearbook) : competing United Kingdom publication
 Almanacco Navale (Italy)
 Weyers Flottentaschenbuch (Germany)

References

External links
  Official web site for French edition 
  Flottes de combat 1940-42, some extracts
  Combat Fleets of the World, 15th ed., some extracts
 All covers of French editions

1897 books
Books of naval history
Nautical reference works